Killa Saifullah, also Qilla Saifullah is a city in Killa Saifullah District, Balochistan, Pakistan.) is a district in northwestern Balochistan province, Pakistan. Killa Saifullah is famous for its fertile soil producing fruits and vegetables. There are numerous apple and apricot orchards exporting fruits to other provinces. The export of vegetables like tomato, carrot and chillies is done commercially on roads and adding enormous share in the agriculture produce of the country. The livestock breeders in Killa Saifullah produce much livestock share for meat and milk purpose for Balochistan province especially Quetta and Zhob divisions.

Historical background
Killa Saifullah is a district in northwestern Balochistan province, Pakistan. It was established as a district in 1988 comprising two former administrative units of Zhob District: the Upper Zhob Sub-division and the sub-tehsil of Badinai, previously named Kashatoo and part of the subdistrict of Kakar Khurasan..
The British sent Zhob Expedition in 1884 in order to occupy the Zhob region through Baratkhail. In the meanwhile in a battle, the castles of Saifullah Khan Khoidadzai and Shah Jehan Jogezai (The Badshah of Zhob) were demolished. On 7 October 1884, an assault on the Qalla (Castle) of Shah Jehan near Akhterzai resulted the killings of many tribal people including Malik Hamza Daulatzai and Mohammad Ghous who fought bravely. All 500 tribal Sardars admitted their submission before the British forces and also signed an agreement that they will not interfere in the affairs of British Government in Zhob region except Saifullah Khan Khoidadzai and Shah Jehan Jogezai, who had a narrow escape from the battle scene and established themselves at Kalat Afghanistan; where they used to operate their insurgency campaign against the British and never subdued before the British Occupying Forces.

Notable people
Nawab Ayaz Jogezai
Usman Khan Kakar
Arman Loni
Wranga Loni
Arfa Siddiq
Maulana Abdul Wasay

Incidents

June 2022
On 8 June 2022, a bus fell into a ravine after trying to drive past a narrow road in Qilla Saifullah, Balochistan, Pakistan, killing all the 22 people on board. The tragedy happened in Akhtarzai, close to Killa Saifullah Bazaar.

References

Populated places in Killa Saifullah District
1438 establishments in Asia
Populated places established in the 1430s
Forts in Balochistan